After the Battle of Heiligerlee, the Dutch rebel leader Louis of Nassau (brother of William the Silent) failed to capture the city of Groningen. Louis was driven away by Fernando Álvarez de Toledo, Duke of Alba and defeated at the Battle of Jemmingen (also known as Battle of Jemgum, at Jemgum in East Frisia, now part of Germany) on 21 July 1568.

Forces
The Spanish army consisted of 12,000 infantry (4 tercios), 3,000 cavalry, and some cannons. Louis of Nassau opposed them with 10,000 infantry (2 groups), some cavalry, and 16 cannons.

Battle
After three hours of skirmishes, Louis' army left its trenches and advanced. Pounded by effective musket fire and intimidated by the Spanish cavalry, the advance turned into a general retreat towards the river Ems.

Aftermath
On 19 May 1571 a statue of the Duke, cast from one of the captured bronze cannons, was placed in Antwerp citadel. After the Sack of Antwerp in 1576, the city joined the Dutch Revolt and in 1577 the statue was destroyed by an angry crowd.

Notes

References
 Laffin, John, Brassey's Dictionary of Battles, Barnes & Noble, 1995.

External links
 The Battle of Jemmingen

1568 in Europe
Jemmingen 1568
Jemmingen
Jemmingen
History of East Frisia
Eighty Years' War (1566–1609)